Bevier is an unincorporated community located in Muhlenberg County, Kentucky, United States.

History
A post office called Bevier was established in 1882, and remained in operation until it was discontinued in 1952. The community was named for Robert S. Bevier, a railroad official.

References

Unincorporated communities in Muhlenberg County, Kentucky
Unincorporated communities in Kentucky